Panther Valley Golf & Country Club (PVGCC) is a private golf course and country club located in Allamuchy Township, in Warren County, New Jersey, just south of Interstate 80 and the Pequest River.

The course was designed by architect Robert Trent Jones Sr., and first opened for play in 1969.

History 
Panther Valley, originally known as Panther Ledge Farm, was carved out of a 4,000 cattle farm belonging to Clendenin J. Ryan Jr., grandson of Thomas Fortune Ryan, a New York City financier who was recorded as the last of the robber barons of Wall Street.

Advertising executive Robert Conahay III purchased the ranch following Ryan's death in 1957 and began parsing it out to developers in the years following.

In 1967, Robert Trent Jones was contracted to design an 18-hole, championship-quality golf course. After many meetings to review plans, construction was started in 1968 on the 1,500-acre course. The front nine holes were opened in the Spring of 1969, and by October the full eighteen holes were ready for play. The largest pool and cabana in the country club section was completed in 1970.

Local legend claims the name comes from the last panther in New Jersey meeting its end in a thicket overlooking what is now the fifth hole.

Membership and facilities 

In addition, the club offers a practice facility consisting of a driving range and putting greens, locker rooms, and an in-person and online pro-shop.

Prospective attendees must either be or be guests of members. The facility offers over eight membership packages, including those for youth and junior golfers, weekend-only players, and those just wishing to join for the pools or dining.

Course 
The longest hole on the course is the 7th—a par-5 that plays to 550 yards from the back tee; the shortest is the 13th—a par-3 that plays to 197 yards from the back. Additionally, water hazards come into play on at least 13 separate areas. As with a number of Jones' course designs, PVGCC offers multiple tee boxes at each hole, allowing players of varying skill levels to participate and choose a faster or slower pace of play.

References 

Golf clubs and courses designed by Robert Trent Jones
Golf clubs and courses in New Jersey
Allamuchy Township, New Jersey
Buildings and structures in Warren County, New Jersey
1969 establishments in New Jersey